The 2000 United States Senate election in New Jersey was held on November 7, 2000. Incumbent Democratic U.S. Senator Frank Lautenberg retired rather than seeking a fourth term. Democratic nominee Jon Corzine, former CEO of Goldman Sachs, defeated the Republican U.S. Representative Bob Franks in a close election.

Primary elections were held on June 7. Corzine defeated former Governor Jim Florio in the Democratic primary by a wide margin after a hard-fought campaign in which Corzine spent over $35 million of his own money. Franks narrowly defeated State Senator William Gormley to capture the Republican nomination. As of 2020, this is the last time the Republican nominee carried Bergen and Burlington counties in a Senate election.

Background
Senator Frank R. Lautenberg was first elected to the Senate in 1982 in an upset victory over Rep. Millicent Fenwick. In his two re-election bids, Lautenberg had always been an underdog . He beat Pete Dawkins in 1988 by a 54%-46% margin and held back a challenge from Assembly Speaker Chuck Haytaian by a smaller margin of 50%-47%.

However, popular Governor Christine Todd Whitman was expected to challenge Lautenberg and opinion polls showed Lautenberg losing by a large margin. Lautenberg retired in 2000, but later regretted his decision because both Whitman and former Governor Tom Kean both declined to run for the Senate. Lautenberg would be elected to New Jersey's other Senate seat in 2002 after his colleague Senator Robert Torricelli resigned in disgrace.

Democratic primary

Candidates 
 Jon Corzine, former CEO of Goldman Sachs
 James Florio, former Governor of New Jersey and U.S. Representative from Camden

Withdrew
 Frank Lautenberg, incumbent Senator since 1983

Declined
 Thomas Byrne, former chair of the New Jersey Democratic Committee
 Frank Pallone, U.S. Representative from Long Branch

Polling

Campaign
Corzine spent $35 million of his fortunes into this primary election alone.

Governor Florio was unpopular during his tenure in office. He signed a $2.8 Billion tax increase in 1990, which resulted in Republicans winning control of the legislature in 1991, and his reelection loss in the 1993 gubernatorial election to Christine Todd Whitman.

Endorsements
Corzine was endorsed by State Senators Raymond Zane, Wayne Bryant, and John Adler. He was also endorsed by U.S. Representative Bob Menendez and U.S. Senator Robert Torricelli.

Florio was endorsed by the New Jersey Democratic Party, Assemblyman Joseph Doria and State Senator John A. Lynch Jr.

Results

Republican primary

Candidates 
 William Gormley, State Senator from Mays Landing
 Bob Franks, U.S. Representative from Summit
 Murray Sabrin, Libertarian nominee for Governor in 1997
 James Treffinger, Essex County Executive and former Mayor of Verona

Declined
Steve Forbes, publisher of Forbes and candidate for President in 1996 (ran for President)
Frank LoBiondo, U.S. Representative from Ventnor City
Christine Todd Whitman, Governor of New Jersey since 1994

Polling

Results

General election

Candidates 
 Jon Corzine (Democratic), former CEO of Goldman Sachs
 Bob Franks (Republican), U.S. Representative from Summit
 Bruce Afran (Green)
 Dennis A. Breen (Independent)
 J.M. Carter (Trust In God)
 Pat DiNizio (Reform)
 Emerson Ellett (Libertarian)
 George Gostigian (God Bless NJ)
 Lorraine LaNeve (Conservative)
 Gregory Pason (Socialist)
 Nancy Rosenstock (Socialist Workers)

Campaign 
Franks, a moderate Republican, attacked Corzine for "trying to buy the election and of advocating big-government spending programs that the nation can ill afford." Corzine accused Franks of wanting to "dismantle" the Social Security system because he supported Governor George W. Bush's partial privatization plan.

During the campaign, Corzine refused to release his income tax return records. He claimed an interest in doing so, but he cited a confidentiality agreement with Goldman Sachs. Skeptics argued that he should have followed the example of his predecessor Robert Rubin, who converted his equity stake into debt upon leaving Goldman.

Corzine campaigned for state government programs including universal health care, universal gun registration, mandatory public preschool, and more taxpayer funding for college education.  He pushed affirmative action and same-sex marriage. David Brooks considered Corzine so liberal that although his predecessor was also a Democrat, his election helped shift the Senate to the left.

During Corzine's campaign for the United States Senate, he made some controversial off-color statements.  When introduced to a man with an Italian name who said he was in the construction business, Corzine quipped: "Oh, you make cement shoes!" according to Emanuel Alfano, chairman of the Italian-American One Voice Committee. Alfano also reported that when introduced to a lawyer named David Stein, Corzine said: "He's not Italian, is he? Oh, I guess he's your Jewish lawyer who is here to get the rest of you out of jail." Corzine denied mentioning religion, but did not deny the quip about Italians, claiming that some of his own ancestors were probably Italian, or maybe French.

Some alleged that Corzine had exchanged endorsements from black ministers for donations, after a foundation controlled by him and his wife donated $25,000 to an influential black church. Rev. Reginald T. Jackson, the director of the Black Ministers Council, and a notable advocate against racial profiling against minority drivers in traffic stops, was criticized for endorsing Corzine after receiving a large donation from the then candidate.

Franks generally trailed Corzine in the polls until the final
week, when he pulled even in a few polls. Corzine spent $63 million, while Franks spent only $6 million. Despite being heavily outspent, Franks lost by only three percentage points, doing better that year than Republican Governor George W. Bush in the presidential election, who obtained just 40% of the vote in the state.

Debates
Complete video of debate, October 7, 2000
Complete video of debate, October 8, 2000
Complete video of debate, October 13, 2000
Complete video of debate, October 20, 2000

Polling 

with Christine Todd Whitman

with Jim Florio

Corzine vs. Gormley

Corzine vs. Treffinger

Franks vs. Byrne

Results

See also 
 2000 United States Senate elections

References

External links 
Official campaign websites (archived)
 Jon Corzine
 Bob Franks

2000
New Jersey
2000 New Jersey elections